Adam's Grave was a Neolithic long barrow near Alton Barnes in Wiltshire, southwest England. Its remains have been scheduled as an ancient monument.

The barrow is considered to be of the Severn-Cotswold tomb type. These generally consist of long, precisely built trapezoidal earth mounds covering burial chambers, thus they are a type of chambered long barrow. The chamber, made of sarsen stones, contained partial human skeletons. An arrowhead was also recovered. It was partially excavated by John Thurnam in 1860. The area around Adam's Grave has a high density of long barrows and is important because of its archaeological potential.

The arrangement of stones around the site suggests there was once a kerb or forecourt. They are known as ‘Old Adam and ‘Little Eve’ and are near the original entrance to the barrow. According to folklore the barrow is the grave of a giant, and his ghost has been reported. Associations with the nearby monument at Avebury have also been suggested.

In the Anglo-Saxon period it was known as "Woden's Barrow" (Old English "Wōdnesbeorġ") and the Anglo-Saxon Chronicle records two battles at the site in 592 and 715.

References

External links

4th-millennium BC architecture
Buildings and structures in Wiltshire
History of Wiltshire
Archaeological sites in Wiltshire
Barrows in England
Stone Age sites in Wiltshire
Scheduled monuments in Wiltshire